Anelaphus is a genus of beetles in the family Cerambycidae, first described by Earle Linsley in 1936.

Species 
Anelaphus contains the following species:
 Anelaphus albofasciatus (Linell, 1897)
 Anelaphus albopilus Chemsak & Noguera, 2003
 Anelaphus asperus (Knull, 1962)
 Anelaphus badius Chemsak, 1991
 Anelaphus belkini Skiles, 1985
 Anelaphus bravoi Galileo & Martins, 2010
 Anelaphus brevidens (Schaeffer, 1908)
 Anelaphus brummermannae Lingafelter, 2020
 Anelaphus bupalpus (Chemsak, 1991)
 Anelaphus cerussatus (Newman, 1841)
 Anelaphus cinereus (Olivier, 1795)
 Anelaphus cinnabarinus Fisher, 1942
 Anelaphus colombianus Martins & Galileo, 2003
 Anelaphus cordiforme Tyson, 2013
 Anelaphus crispulus (Fisher, 1947)
 Anelaphus curacaoensis Gilmour, 1968
 Anelaphus daedaleus (Bates, 1874)
 Anelaphus debilis (LeConte, 1854)
 Anelaphus dentatus Chemsak, 1962
 Anelaphus erakyra Galileo, Martins & Santos-Silva, 2015
 Anelaphus erici Santos-Silva, 2021
 Anelaphus eximius (Bates, 1885)
 Anelaphus fasciatum Fisher, 1932
 Anelaphus flavofasciatus Nascimento, 2018
 Anelaphus giesberti Chemsak & Linsley, 1979
 Anelaphus guttiventre (Chevrolat, 1862)
 Anelaphus hirtus Chemsak & Noguera, 2003
 Anelaphus hispaniolae Fisher, 1932
 Anelaphus inermis (Newman, 1840)
 Anelaphus inflaticollis Chemsak, 1959
 Anelaphus inornatus (Chemsak & Linsley, 1979)
 Anelaphus izabalensis Santos-Silva, 2021
 Anelaphus jansoni Linsley, 1961
 Anelaphus lanuginosus (Bates, 1885)
 Anelaphus lingafelteri Touroult, 2014
 Anelaphus maculatum (Chemsak & Noguera, 1993)
 Anelaphus magnipunctatus (Knull, 1934)
 Anelaphus martinsi Monné, 2006
 Anelaphus michelbacheri Linsley, 1942
 Anelaphus misellus (Bates, 1885)
 Anelaphus moestus (LeConte, 1854)
 Anelaphus mutatus (Gahan, 1890)
 Anelaphus nanus (Fabricius, 1792)
 Anelaphus nitidipennis Chemsak & Linsley, 1968
 Anelaphus niveivestitus (Schaeffer, 1905)
 Anelaphus panamensis Linsley, 1961
 Anelaphus piceus (Chemsak, 1962)
 Anelaphus pilosus Chemsak & Noguera, 2003
 Anelaphus praeclarus Lingafelter, 2008
 Anelaphus pumilus (Newman, 1840)
 Anelaphus punctatus (LeConte, 1873)
 Anelaphus robi Hrabovsky, 1987
 Anelaphus rotundus Vlasak & Santos-Silva, 2020
 Anelaphus savinai Audureau, 2021
 Anelaphus similis (Schaeffer, 1908)
 Anelaphus souzai (Zajciw, 1964)
 Anelaphus sparsus Martins & Galileo, 2003
 Anelaphus spurcus (LeConte, 1854)
 Anelaphus steveni Santos-Silva, 2021
 Anelaphus subdepressus (Schaeffer, 1904)
 Anelaphus subfasciatus (Gahan, 1895)
 Anelaphus subinermis Linsley, 1957
 Anelaphus submoestus Linsley, 1942
 Anelaphus subseriatus (Bates, 1885)
 Anelaphus tikalinus Chemsak & Noguera, 2003
 Anelaphus transversus (White, 1853)
 Anelaphus trinidadensis Martins & Galileo, 2010
 Anelaphus undulatus (Bates, 1880)
 Anelaphus vandenberghei Devesa, Lingafelter & Santos-Silva, 2021
 Anelaphus velteni Vitali, 2009
 Anelaphus vernus Chemsak, 1991
 Anelaphus villosus (Fabricius, 1792)
 Anelaphus yucatecus Chemsak & Noguera, 2003
 Anelaphus zacapensis Santos-Silva, 2021

References

 
Elaphidiini